This is a chronological list of ship commissionings in 1937.



See also 

1937